Maksym Valeriyovych Borovkov (born on 5 April 1977) is a professional Ukrainian football midfielder and forward who plays for FSC Prykarpattya Ivano-Frankivsk in the Ukrainian First League. He has previously played for FC Metalurh Novomoskovsk, FC Elektrometalurh-NZF Nikopol, FC Krasyliv, FC Podillya Khmelnytskyi, Prykarpattya Ivano-Frankivsk and FC Desna Chernihiv.

References

External links 
 
 

1977 births
Living people
Footballers from Dnipro
Ukrainian footballers
FC Elektrometalurh-NZF Nikopol players
FC Podillya Khmelnytskyi players
FC Spartak Ivano-Frankivsk players
FC Desna Chernihiv players
FC Prykarpattia Ivano-Frankivsk (2004) players
Association football midfielders
Association football forwards